is a Japanese music slice of life seinen manga series written and illustrated by Akira Sasō. It was published by Futabasha, with serialization from 2003 to 2007, first on the manga magazine Manga Action and later on the website Futabasha Web Magazine. It was compiled in three volumes published between 2004 and 2008. It was adapted into a live action drama film titled Maestro!, directed by Shōtarō Kobayashi and released on January 31, 2015.

Characters
Tendō (Toshiyuki Nishida)
Kōsaka (Tori Matsuzaka)
(miwa)

Volumes
1 (July 17, 2004)
2 (January 27, 2007)
3 (March 28, 2008)

Reception
It won an Excellence Prize in the Manga Division at the 12th Japan Media Arts Awards. It was also nominated for the 13th Tezuka Osamu Cultural Prize.

References

External links
Official film website 

2015 drama films
Live-action films based on manga
Futabasha manga
Japanese drama films
Manga adapted into films
Music in anime and manga
Seinen manga
Slice of life anime and manga
Films with screenplays by Satoko Okudera
2010s Japanese films